Cao Teng (died  late 150s), courtesy name Jixing, was a eunuch who lived during the Eastern Han dynasty of China. He served four Han emperors (Shun, Chong, Zhi, and Huan). Through his adopted son Cao Song, he was the grandfather of Cao Cao, who laid the foundations for the state of Cao Wei in the Three Kingdoms period. In 220, upon the establishment of Wei by Cao Cao's son Cao Pi, Cao Teng was posthumously honoured as "Emperor Gao of Wei", becoming the only eunuch in Chinese officialdom to have this honor.

Life
Cao Teng served as an Attendant at the Yellow Gates in the Han imperial court during the reign of Emperor An. In 120, when Emperor Shun was still a prince, Empress Dowager Deng appointed Cao Teng to serve the prince because Cao Teng was honest, modest and prudent. Cao Teng gained the trust of Emperor Shun and became his personal friend. In 126, after Emperor Shun ascended the throne, Cao Teng was promoted to Central Regular Attendant, the highest possible rank for a court eunuch.

After Emperor Shun died, his infant son died after just one year on the throne. The general Liang Ji installed the seven-year-old Liu Zuan on the throne, overruling the popularity of another candidate, Liu Suan. Despite his young age, Liu Zuan showed signs of resentment towards Liang Ji's domineering influence, and was soon poisoned by the general. The imperial court was once again divided in deciding the successor. One group, led by Li Gu, wanted to install Liu Suan on the throne, while Liang Ji led another faction which supported the young Liu Zhi. Cao Teng took Liang Ji's side and urged him to defy his critics, and soon the majority backed down.

After Liu Zhi, or Emperor Huan as he came to be known, ascended the throne, Cao Teng was rewarded with enfeoffment as the Marquis of Fei Village for his participation in the succession debate. He was later promoted to Empress's Chamberlain and was placed in charge of the household of Empress Liang Nüying. He also served as Coachman of the Changle Palace of Empress Dowager Liang Na.

Cao Teng stayed in the court for 30 years, having served four emperors, and was said to have never made big mistakes. The people he promoted were all very famous throughout the empire, such as Yu Fang, Bian Shao and Zhao Dian. Cao Teng was a broad-minded person. Once, a provincial governor Zhong Hao found evidence that Cao Teng had received bribes and tried, unsuccessfully, to impeach Cao Teng. Despite this, Cao Teng often recommended Zhong Hao to higher positions. Cao Teng was remembered by his contemporaries for his personality and integrity. After Cao Teng died in the late 150s, his foster son Cao Song inherited his marquis title.

Family

See also
 Lists of people of the Three Kingdoms

References

 
 
 Fan Ye (5th century). Book of the Later Han (Houhanshu), Volume 78.

Eunuchs during the end of the Han dynasty
Han dynasty politicians from Anhui
Politicians from Bozhou